"Prisoner of Hope" is a song written by Sterling Whipple and Gerald Metcalf, and recorded by American country music artist Johnny Lee. It was released in May 1981 as the fourth single from the album Lookin for Love.  The song reached number 3 on the Billboard Hot Country Singles & Tracks chart.

Chart performance

References

1981 singles
Johnny Lee (singer) songs
Song recordings produced by Jim Ed Norman
Asylum Records singles
1981 songs
Songs written by Sterling Whipple